John XII (? – after 1308) was the Ecumenical Patriarch of Constantinople from 1294 to 1303. John XII was born in Sozopolis on the western Black Sea coast (now Sozopol, Bulgaria). Prior to becoming patriarch, he was known as Kosmas. He crowned Michael IX as co-emperor on 21 May 1294. [1] He led a coalition of bishops against Andronicus II's attempt to use the power of the Church to suppress uprisings. [1] 

References

13th-century patriarchs of Constantinople
People from Sozopol
14th-century patriarchs of Constantinople